New Holland is a village in Logan County, Illinois, United States. The population was 269 at the 2010 census, down from 318 in 2000.

Geography

Illinois Route 10 runs through the village.

Demographics

Per the 2010 US Census, New Holland had 269 people.  Among non-Hispanics this includes 259 White (91.4%), 3 Native American, & 2 from two or more races.  The Hispanic or Latino population included 5 people.

There were 114 households, out of which 30 had children under the age of 18 living with them, 54 were married couples living together, 6 had a female householder with children & no husband present, and 45 were non-families. 38 households were made up of individuals, and 31 had someone who was 65 years of age or older. The average household size was 2.36 and the average family size was 3.01.

The population was spread out, with 77.7% over the age of 18 and 16.0% who were 65 years of age or older. The median age was 42.9 years. The gender ratio was 51.7% male & 48.3% female.  Among 114 occupied households, 86.8% were owner-occupied & 13.2% were renter-occupied.

As of the census of 2000, there were 318 people, 126 households, and 86 families residing in the village. The racial makeup of the village was 99.06% White, and 0.94% from two or more races.

There were 126 households, out of which 32.5% had children under the age of 18 living with them, 60.3% were married couples living together, 4.8% had a female householder with no husband present, and 31.0% were non-families. 26.2% of all households were made up of individuals, and 17.5% had someone living alone who was 65 years of age or older. The average household size was 2.52 and the average family size was 3.09.

In the village, the population was spread out, with 28.3% under the age of 18, 6.9% from 18 to 24, 27.0% from 25 to 44, 18.9% from 45 to 64, and 18.9% who were 65 years of age or older. The median age was 37 years. For every 100 females, there were 98.8 males. For every 100 females age 18 and over, there were 94.9 males.

The median income for a household in the village was $40,278, and the median income for a family was $45,313. Males had a median income of $36,250 versus $21,944 for females. The per capita income for the village was $19,241. About 9.2% of families and 10.8% of the population were below the poverty line, including 20.5% of those under age 18 and 4.5% of those age 65 or over.

Education
New Holland-Middletown Elementary School District 88 operates the primary and middle school for the community. The high school for students assigned to District 88 schools is Lincoln Community High School.

References

Villages in Logan County, Illinois
Villages in Illinois